Cado Lee Ka To MH (born 27 December 1991) is a Hong Kong rugby union and rugby sevens player. He plays for USRC Tigers RFC, the Hong Kong national sevens team and the Hong Kong national rugby union team.

Biography

2009–2017 
Lee started playing rugby when he attended high school in England, and became involved with the Hong Kong Under-20 team on his return to his country of birth. He was a member of the Hong Kong Sevens team at the 2011 Asian Sevens Series. He joined the Hong Kong Sports Institute on a part-time basis in December 2013 when rugby sevens became the first team sport admitted to the institute.

Move to Japan 
In August 2017 Lee became the first Chinese player to be recruited by a Top League club, the NEC Green Rockets in Japan. He signed a one-year deal with the Abiko-based club, and made ten appearances during the 2017–18 Top League season. Despite NEC offering him a one-year contract extension, he returned to Hong Kong in early 2018 to prepare for the Hong Kong Sevens which served as qualification of World Rugby Sevens Series, Rugby World Cup Sevens and Asian Games.

Hong Kong 2018 
In the 2018 Hong Kong Sevens, Hong Kong was eliminated by Chile in the quarter finals, failing to gain promotion to following year's World Series. In the 2018 Rugby World Cup Sevens, Hong Kong again lost to Chile again to finish as runners-up in the Bowl Final. In the 2018 Asian Games, he helped Hong Kong to win all their games in both the group and knockout stages, including a 14–0 victory against Japan to become one of the first gold medal winners for Hong Kong in rugby sevens.

2022 
Lee competed for Hong Kong at the 2022 Rugby World Cup Sevens in Cape Town.

References

1991 births
Living people
Hong Kong rugby union players
Hong Kong international rugby sevens players
Rugby union players at the 2014 Asian Games
Rugby union players at the 2018 Asian Games
Asian Games gold medalists for Hong Kong
Asian Games silver medalists for Hong Kong
Asian Games medalists in rugby union
Medalists at the 2014 Asian Games
Medalists at the 2018 Asian Games
Alumni of the University of Hong Kong
Green Rockets Tokatsu players
Hong Kong international rugby union players
Hong Kong expatriates in England
Rugby union scrum-halves
Hong Kong expatriate sportspeople in Japan
Hong Kong expatriate rugby union players
Expatriate rugby union players in Japan